Oronzo Mario Scarano (1 June 1847 – 28 December 1901) was an Italian composer and conductor. He composed several operas and operettas, the majority of which premiered in Naples.

Scarano was born in Mottola, a small town in southern Italy. Until he was 20 he worked with his father who was a carpenter but he also studied music with the local bandmaster. His talent for music led to his father sending him to the Naples conservatory at considerable financial sacrifice. There he studied composition under Giorgio Miceli.

References

1847 births
1901 deaths
Italian opera composers
Male opera composers
People from the Province of Taranto
19th-century Italian male musicians